This a listing of motorcycles of the 1950s, including those on sale, introduced, or otherwise relevant in this period.

AJS 18 (1949-1963)
AJS Model 31
Ariel Leader
BMW R24
BMW R25
BMW R25/2
BMW R25/3
BMW R51/2
BMW R51/3
BMW R67
BMW R67/2
BMW R67/3
BMW R68
BMW R50
BMW R60
BMW R69
BSA C15
BSA Golden Flash
BSA Road Rocket
BSA Super Rocket
BSA Sunbeam
Douglas Dragonfly
Ducati Aurea
Ducati 125 T
Ducati 125 TV
Ducati 65T
Ducati 65TL
Ducati 65TS
Ducati 98
Harley-Davidson Hummer
Harley-Davidson KR
Harley-Davidson K, KK, KH, KHK
Harley-Davidson Sportster
Harley-Davidson Servi-Car (produced 1932-1973)
Harley Davidson Duo-Glide
Heinkel Tourist
Honda Juno
Honda Super Cub
Honda C71, C76, C72, C77 Dream
Honda C92, CB92, C95 Benly
Indian Chief (till 1953)
James Commodore
Maicoletta
Maico Mobil
Matchless G12
Matchless G50
Moto Guzzi Cardellino
Moto Guzzi V8
MV Agusta 125 SOHC
Norton Dominator
OEC
Panther Model 100
Panther Model 120
Puch 250 SGS (a.k.a. Sears Twingle)
Royal Enfield Fury
Royal Enfield Super Meteor
Tote Gote
Triumph Bonneville
Triumph Bonneville T120
Triumph Thunderbird ('49-'66 misc. versions)
Triumph Tigress
Triumph Tiger T110
Velocette - (Various Models)
Vincent Black Knight
Vincent Black Prince
Vincent Black Lightning
Yamaha YA-1
Zündapp Bella

Gallery

See also

List of motorcycles of the 1910s
List of motorcycles of the 1920s
List of motorcycles of the 1930s
List of motorcycles of the 1940s
List of motorcycle manufacturers
Cyclecars
Ford Model T
Horse and buggy
Safety bicycle
List of motorized trikes
List of motorcycles by type of engine

References

Lists of motorcycles
Motorcycles introduced in the 1950s